The Peerage Bill was a 1719 measure proposed by the British Whig government led by James Stanhope, 1st Earl Stanhope, and Charles Spencer, 3rd Earl of Sunderland, which would have largely halted the creation of new peerages, limiting membership of the House of Lords.

It was inspired by a desire to prevent a repeat of the 1711 creation of twelve Tory peers, known widely as "Harley's Dozen", in order to secure the passage of the peace treaty with France through the Whig-dominated Lords. Following the Whig Split of 1717 there was also a wish to stop Prince George, once King, from packing the house with his own supporters.

The proposal had an attraction to existing aristocrats both Tory and Whig. However, Robert Walpole rallied opposition to it and successfully appealed to MPs by arguing the bill would deny them and their families the opportunity of ever being allowed to join the aristocracy. He also mocked Stanhope, who had recently been made a Lord, for being "desirous to shut the door after him". Tories also strongly opposed the measure, including Robert Harley who criticised the proposal as potentially undermining Britain's constitution. 

The Bill led to a public dispute between Joseph Addison and Richard Steele, former friends and collaborators and both Whig members of the Kit-Kat Club. Addison supported the Bill while Steele opposed it. 

The proposal was finally defeated in the House of Commons on 8 December 1719. The following year Walpole and his opposition Whig allies rejoined the government, ending the party's split.

References

Bibliography
 Black, Jermey. Walpole in Power. Sutton Publishing, 2001.
 Field, Ophelia. The Kit-Cat Club: Friends who Imagined a Nation. Harper Collins, 2008.
 Hamilton, Elizabeth. The Backstairs Dragon: A Life of Robert Harley, Earl of Oxford. Hamilton, 1969.
 Hill, Brian W. The Early Parties and Politics in Britain, 1688–1832. Macmillan, 1996.
 Pearce, Edward. The Great Man: Sir Robert Walpole: Scoundrel, Genius and Britain's First Prime Minister. Random House, 2011.

1719 in Great Britain
Proposed laws of the United Kingdom
House of Lords